Bahuguna is an Indian Garhwali clan, found in Indian State of Uttarakhand. Common variations of the surname were formed during British-India to include "Bahugun", "Bhugun", "Bhuguna", as reported by Prof. C.Bahuguna in 1967.

Notable Bahugunas
 Abodh Bandhu Bahuguna (1927–2004), Hindi and Garhwali writer and poet
Harsh Vardhan Bahuguna (1939–1971), Indian mountaineer, Padma Shri (1972)
 Hemwati Nandan Bahuguna, former Chief Minister of Uttar Pradesh
Jai Vardhan Bahuguna (1948–1985), Indian army officer and mountaineer, younger brother of Harsh Vardhan Bahuguna
Kamala Bahuguna (1923–2001), Indian Lok Sabha member
 Rita Bahuguna Joshi, former PCC Chief, Uttar Pradesh and Present BJP Leader
Saurabh Bahuguna, Indian Member of the Uttarakhand Legislative Assembly
 Sundarlal Bahuguna, the pioneer of Chipko Movement
 Vijay Bahuguna, former Chief Minister of Uttarakhand

References 

Surnames
Indian surnames
Surnames of Indian origin
Surnames of Hindustani origin
Hindu surnames
Himalayan peoples
Social groups of India
Social groups of Uttarakhand
Brahmin communities of Uttarakhand